Leopold "Leo" James Maxse (11 November 1864 – 22 January 1932) was an English amateur tennis player and journalist and editor of the conservative British publication, National Review, between August 1893 and his death in January 1932; he was succeeded as editor by his sister, Violet Milner. He was the son of Admiral Frederick Maxse, a Radical Liberal Unionist, who bought the National Review for him in 1893. Before the Great War, Maxse argued against liberal idealism in foreign policy, Cobdenite pacifism, Radical cosmopolitanism and, following the turn of the century, constantly warned of the 'German menace'.

Life
Maxse was educated at Harrow School and King's College, Cambridge, where he took no degree. While at the latter institution he was elected President of the Cambridge Union Society. He was a close friend of journalist and neo-Jacobite Herbert Vivian at Cambridge, and both were frequent visitors at Oscar Browning's apartment.

He was a member of the Coefficients dining club of social reformers set up in 1902 by the Fabian campaigners Sidney and Beatrice Webb, but would then go on to be one of the most prominent and influential of the tory Die-Hards.

The National Review did not gain a distinct voice until the early part of the twentieth century. In 1903 Maxse became an ardent supporter of Joseph Chamberlain's Tariff Reform proposals. The National Review then became the most prominent ideological mainstay of the right-wing of the Conservative Party for two decades, and would flail those members of the Conservative Party who showed the slightest sign of equivocating on support for the House of Lords, the Union, and the Empire in the required manner. In 1911 he conducted the "B.M.G." (Balfour Must Go) campaign which resulted in Arthur Balfour resigning as Leader of the Conservative Party, showing that Maxse had become a force to be reckoned among Conservative opinion makers.

Maxse supported the Entente, demanded rearmament and a strong policy against the German Empire, which he considered to be the greatest threat to the British Empire. Maxse eagerly welcomed the Great War, but was critical of the government's failings. From 1917 he supported the National party against the Conservative Party leadership, whom he regarded as subservient to David Lloyd George and who would, therefore, keep him in high office.

Maxse argued that the 1918 victory against Germany gave the Allies a fleeting opportunity to destroy German power. He viewed the Treaty of Versailles as ineffectual towards that aim and blamed Allied politicians, Lloyd George especially, for bowing to President Wilson's pressure to make the treaty less harsh. Maxse believed Germany was still able to restore itself as the dominant European power. 

Maxse vehemently opposed the League of Nations: in his view the League was a "front-bench affair hurriedly adopted and recklessly advocated simply and solely to please President Wilson". He claimed Hindenburg and Ludendorff controlled Germany from behind-the-scenes, regardless of which politician was in office, and that it was unnecessary to appease Germany to prevent her from going Bolshevik because Prussian militarism was still the dominant force.

The Allied intervention in Russia, aimed at overthrowing the Bolsheviks, was supported by Maxse, not just because he disliked Bolshevism but because he wanted Russia to resume her pre-revolution role of being an anti-German power. Maxse was also pro-French and pro-Polish. During 1920–1922, Maxse attacked Lloyd George for failing to "f[i]ght for a...greater France, support...Poland, sustain...Bohemia, nourish...Rumania [and] uphold our allies in Russia".

He became an outspoken critic of British Zionism, condemning attempts to occupy Palestine.

Maxse would lose influence with the advent of Stanley Baldwin as leader of the Conservative Party.

Works
The Great Marconi Mystery (London: The National Review Office, 1913).
"Germany on the Brain", or, the Obsession of "A Crank": Gleanings from The National Review, 1899–1914 (London: The National Review Office, 1915).
(preface), Victory or Free Trade? (London: The National Review Office, 1917).
Politicians on the War-Path (London: The National Review Office, 1920).

Notes

References

External links
Biographical notes on Maxse at the University of Glasgow.
The Genesis of the "A.B.C." Memorandum of 1901.

People educated at Harrow School
Alumni of King's College, Cambridge
Presidents of the Cambridge Union
British magazine editors
English male tennis players
British male tennis players
1864 births
1932 deaths
Leopold
Tennis people from Greater London